Trine Dalgaard Fomsgaard Pedersen (born 3 May 1993) is a Danish handball player who plays as centre back for Danish club Odense Håndbold in the Bambusa Kvindeligaen. She has previously played for Silkeborg-Voel KFUM, Skanderborg Håndbold and TTH Holstebro, played around 150 matches in the Damehåndboldligaen.

On 3 August 2021, it was announced that she had signed a 1-year contract with Odense Håndbold, from HH Elite.

Achievements
Danish Women's Handball Cup:
Silver Medalist: 2022
Bronze Medalist: 2019

References

1993 births
Living people
Danish female handball players
People from Horsens
Sportspeople from the Central Denmark Region